Winnemucca station is an Amtrak train station in Winnemucca, Nevada. It is served by one daily train in each direction on the California Zephyr.

History

The Central Pacific Railroad reached Winnemucca on September 16, 1868, and the first train arrived to the town on October 1. The line was later acquired by the Southern Pacific Railroad. The first transcontinental train rolled through on May 11, 1869. Amtrak took over intercity passenger rail service in the United States in May 1971 and service to Winnemucca continued on the City of San Francisco (later renamed San Francisco Zephyr, and later California Zephyr). 

A small shelter was installed in 1993. In early 2012, a  accessible platform and a brick station building were constructed for the station as part of a $1.26 million project (equivalent to $ today).

References

External links

Winnemucca, NV – USA Rail Guide (TrainWeb)

Amtrak stations in Nevada
Amtrak
Buildings and structures in Humboldt County, Nevada
Transportation in Humboldt County, Nevada
Former Southern Pacific Railroad stations in Nevada
Railway stations in the United States opened in 1868